1840 Hus is a stony Koronis asteroid from the outer regions of the asteroid belt, approximately  in diameter. It was discovered on 26 October 1971, by Czech astronomer Luboš Kohoutek at the Bergedorf Observatory in Hamburg, Germany. The S-type asteroid has a rotation period of 4.8 hours and is likely elongated in shape. It was later named after 15th-century theologian Jan Hus.

Orbit and classification 

Hus is a core member of the Koronis family, a very large asteroid family of almost 6,000 known asteroids with nearly co-planar ecliptical orbits. It orbits the Sun in the outer main-belt at a distance of 2.9–3.0 AU once every 5 years (1,821 days; semi-major axis of 2.92 AU). Its orbit has an eccentricity of 0.02 and an inclination of 2° with respect to the ecliptic.

Naming 

This minor planet was named after Czech Jan Hus (1372–1415), a fifteenth century Bohemian theologian, rector of Charles University in Prague and forerunner of the protestant reformation. He was condemned to death by the Council of Constance and burned at the stake for his reformation ideas. Jan Hus is also known as John Huss in the English speaking world. The official  was published by the Minor Planet Center on 20 December 1974.

Physical characteristics 

Based on the asteroid's membership to the Koronis family and its relatively high geometric albedo determined by the Wide-field Infrared Survey Explorer (WISE), Hus is very likely a stony S-type asteroid.

Rotation period and pole 

In June 2006, a rotational lightcurve of Hus was obtained from photometric observations taken by Maurice Clark at the Chiro Observatory  in Western Australia. Lightcurve analysis gave a rotation period of  hours with a high brightness variation of 0.85 magnitude, strongly indicative of an elongated, non-spherical shape. In March 2016, a synthetic lightcurve gave a similar period of  hours, using sparse-in-time photometry data from the Lowell Photometric Database. More recent lightcurve analysis during observations of the 1840 Hus apparition in 2020, from the MIT Koronis Family Asteroids Rotation Lightcurve Observing Program, gave a secure rotation period of  hours.

Diameter and albedo 

According to the survey carried out by NASA's WISE telescope with its subsequent NEOWISE mission, Hus measures 12.4 and 12.6 kilometers in diameter, and its surface has an albedo of 0.261 and 0.255, respectively. Conversely, the Collaborative Asteroid Lightcurve Link assumes a standard albedo for carbonaceous asteroids of 0.057, rather than one for a stony body, as indicated by WISE/NEOWISE – and calculates therefore a twice as large diameter of 25.4 kilometers, as the lower the albedo, the larger the body's diameter for a constant absolute magnitude.

References

External links 
 A Simple Guide to NEOWISE Data Problems, Nathan Myhrvold, 25 May 2016
 Asteroid Lightcurve Database (LCDB), query form (info )
 Dictionary of Minor Planet Names, Google books
 Discovery Circumstances: Numbered Minor Planets (1)-(5000) – Minor Planet Center
 
 
 

001840
Discoveries by Luboš Kohoutek
Named minor planets
1840 Hus
19711026